Fred Wampler (October 15, 1909 – June 8, 1999) was an American World War II and Korean War veteran who served one term as a U.S. Representative from Indiana from 1959 to 1961.

Biography 
Born in Carrier Mills, Illinois, Wampler earned a B.A. from Indiana State University in Terre Haute, Indiana (at the time, Indiana State Teachers College), and an M.A. in 1940 from Indiana University. A veteran of both World War II and the Korean War, he served in the United States Navy, (1944–46 and 1950–54); and in the United States Naval Reserve, (1946–49 and 1954–60) for a total of 15 years.

An excellent collegiate athlete, he was awarded 12 letters by Indiana State from 1928-1931, he entered the local high school teaching and coaching ranks following graduation.  Over the next 21 years he was a teacher, the head football coach and assistant coach in tennis, golf and basketball at his alma mater, Gerstmeyer High School in Terre Haute, where he had lettered in four sports (baseball, basketball, football and track) as a student. From 1947 to 1949, during off seasons, he was a radio sports director and announcer.

Congress 
Wampler was elected as a Democrat to the Eighty-sixth Congress (January 3, 1959 – January 3, 1961).
He was an unsuccessful candidate for reelection to the Eighty-seventh Congress in 1960 and for election to the Eighty-eighth Congress in 1962.

Later career and death 
He was appointed to the Indiana-Illinois Wabash Valley Interstate Commission, serving from 1961 to 1962, and was regional coordinator, U.S. Department of the Interior, from 1963 to 1970. He also served as state and federal funding coordinator for the Ohio State Department of Natural Resources and Transportation from 1971 to 1976.

He died at age 90 in Mason, Ohio, and was interred in Roselawn Memorial Park, Terre Haute, Indiana.

References

 

1909 births
1999 deaths
People from Saline County, Illinois
Indiana State University alumni
Indiana State Sycamores football players
Democratic Party members of the United States House of Representatives from Indiana
20th-century American politicians